The Arma people are an ethnic group of the Niger River valley.

Armas may also refer to:

People 
 Balthazar Armas (born 1941), Venezuelan painter
 Carlos Castillo Armas (1914-1957), Guatemalan president
 Chris Armas (born 1972), American soccer player
 Christian Armas (born 1986), Mexican footballer
 Frederick A. de Armas, American literature professor
 Joel Armas (born 1973), American swimmer
 Marcos Armas (born 1969), Venezuelan baseball player
 Reynaldo Armas (born 1953), Venezuelan singer and composer
 Tony Armas (born 1953), Venezuelan baseball player
 Tony Armas Jr. (born 1978), Venezuelan baseball player
 Ximena Armas (born 1946), Chilean painter
 Ana de Armas (born 1988), Cuban-Spanish actress

Other uses 
 Naviera  Armas, a Spanish ferry company

See also
Arma (disambiguation)